Roller Trio is the eponymous debut studio album by Leeds Jazz-Rock ensemble Roller Trio.  The album, released in August 2012 through British F-IRE Collective record label, was a nominee for the 2012 Mercury Prize.

Track listing

Personnel

References

External links

 
 

2012 albums
Roller Trio albums